Copenhagen is a brand of dipping tobacco made by the U.S. Smokeless Tobacco Company.

Packaging and cuts
The product is available in pouches and different cuts of tobacco, including Fine Cut, Long Cut, and Extra Long Cut. Copenhagen Original Snuff, Long Cut, and pouches come in a 1.2 ounce can now made with a fiberboard bottom and metal lid, however, a few flavors still use the plastic bottom. The brand also offers other flavors like Wintergreen, Mint, Straight, Original, Southern Blend, and, seasonally, Black; all are available in long-cut, fine-cut, and pouches except for Black and Southern Blend. If it is offered as tax-exempt for use outside the US, the original flavor is packaged in an all-fiberboard bottom can with a tin lid, while all the rest of the flavors have a plastic can with the same lid as the original.

Copenhagen dipping tobacco delivers varying contents of nicotine, depending on the cut.

Differences among types
In 2006, Copenhagen's marketing team introduced "Cope" as a side brand. While two of the flavors introduced with this side brand were unique, Long Cut Straight was already offered under the main Copenhagen branding. "Cope" was marketed as being premium tobacco. The Cope brand was discontinued in 2017.

Pricing
Copenhagen has two levels of pricing within its line. Snuff, Original, Long-Cut, Original Pouches, and Weyman's Reserve are considered premium levels. In the United States, premium line dips are priced about one to two dollars more than their sub-premium counterparts, and all except the Weyman's Reserve come in fiberboard-bottom cans. The remaining flavors, Straight, Mint, Wintergreen, Natural, and Southern Blend, fall into a sub-premium level.

History

1822: George Weyman begins producing Copenhagen Snuff in Pittsburgh, Pennsylvania.
1922: After a series of acquisitions and breakups, the company is renamed United States Tobacco Company.
1934: United States Tobacco Company introduces Skoal Wintergreen — the first of its kind for the company.
1968: Copenhagen introduces Copenhagen Snuff in a can.
1983: Skoal Bandits is introduced, breaking ground for Copenhagen to have its own brand of pouches.
1984: Skoal Long Cut is introduced, again a first for UST.
1997: Copenhagen Long Cut is introduced.
2001: Copenhagen Pouches (original flavor) is introduced.
2002: Copenhagen Mid Cut Black (Bourbon Flavored) is introduced.
2005: Copenhagen Long Cut Straight is introduced.
2009: Copenhagen Wintergreen Long Cut is introduced.
2011: Copenhagen Wintergreen Pouches is introduced.
2012: Copenhagen Southern Blend is introduced (only Eastern US)
2013: Copenhagen Mint Long Cut and Pouches are introduced in test markets.
2016: Copenhagen Mint Long Cut and Pouches are introduced nationwide.
2017: Copenhagen Weyman's Reserve is introduced.
2017: Copenhagen Smooth Mint and Copenhagen Smooth Wintergreen are introduced in Pennsylvania for test marketing. They have yet to be released in any other states.
2018: Copenhagen Southern Blend is introduced nationwide.
2019: Copenhagen Smooth Wintergreen is released nationwide.
2020: Copenhagen Wintergreen Packs, a more pliable and softer version of Copenhagen Wintergreen Pouches is released nationwide.

Varieties

Copenhagen Original Snuff (Fine Cut): introduced in 1822
Copenhagen Original Long Cut: introduced in 1997
Copenhagen Original Pouches: introduced in 2001
Copenhagen Mid Cut Black (discontinued): released in April 2011 Replaced by Long Cut Black.
Cope Long Cut Whiskey Blend (discontinued): released September 17, 2007
Cope Long Cut Smooth Hickory (discontinued): released September 17, 2007
Cope Long Cut Straight released September 17, 2007
Copenhagen Long Cut Wintergreen: introduced in November 2009
Copenhagen Extra Long Cut Natural: introduced in 2010
Copenhagen Long Cut Straight: released in 2010
Copenhagen Long Cut Black (discontinued)
Copenhagen Wintergreen Pouches
Copenhagen Long Cut Southern Blend
Copenhagen Long Cut Mint: released in March 2016
Copenhagen Mint Pouches: released in March 2016
Copenhagen Weyman's Reserve: released in late 2017
Copenhagen Smooth Mint: released as a test product to Pennsylvania in late 2017
Copenhagen Smooth Wintergreen: released as a test product to Pennsylvania in late 2017, and again in late 2018 to a wider market

References

Chewing tobacco brands
IARC Group 1 carcinogens